This is a list of schools in the Roman Catholic Diocese of Fort Worth.

K-12 schools
 Sacred Heart Catholic School, Muenster

High schools
 Cassata Catholic High School (Fort Worth)
 Nolan Catholic High School (Fort Worth)

Note that Cristo Rey Fort Worth College Prep is separate from the diocese.

Grade schools
 All Saints School (Fort Worth)
 Holy Family School (Fort Worth)
 Holy Trinity School (Grapevine)
 Immaculate Conception School (Denton)
 Our Lady of Victory School (Fort Worth)
 Saint Andrew School (Fort Worth)
 St. Elizabeth Ann Seton School (Keller)
 St. George School (Fort Worth)
 St. John the Apostle School (North Richland Hills)
 St. Joseph School (Arlington)
 St. Maria Goretti (Arlington)
 St. Martin de Porres School (Prosper)
 St. Mary School (Gainesville)
 St. Peter the Apostle School (Fort Worth)
 St. Rita School (Fort Worth)

Former schools
 Our Mother of Mercy School was previously in operation. In 2016 the diocese announced that the school would close and its building would become Cristo Rey Fort Worth College Prep.

References

External links
 Schools of the Fort Worth Diocese

Fort Worth, Roman Catholic Diocese of
Education in Fort Worth, Texas